Viy is a Ukrainian ethnic-rock band originating from the capital Kyiv in 1991.

Discography

 Chorna Rillia (Чорна Рілля, 2001)
 Khata Skraiu Sela (Хата скраю села, 2003)
 Chorna Rillia Collector's Edition (Чорна Рілля, 2004)
 Rock Legends of Ukraine - Viy (Рок-легенди України — Вій, 2004)
 Viy Multimedia Encyclopedia (2005)
 Khata Skraiu Sela (Хата скраю села, 2006)

External links
 Viy official website
 music by Viy on libre.fm

Ukrainian rock music groups